Justin Jennings is a former rugby league football player.

Justin Jennings may also refer to:

Justin Jennings (racing driver) (born 1992), American race car driver